Lara Arruabarrena and Lourdes Domínguez Lino were the defending champions, but they decided not to participate this year.
Yuliya Beygelzimer and Olga Savchuk won the title, defeating first-seeded Klára Koukalová and Monica Niculescu in the final, 6–4, 5–7, [10–7].

Seeds

Draw

References 
 Main draw

BNP Paribas Katowice Open - Doubles
2014 Doubles